Bouwens is a Dutch patronymic surname meaning "Bouwe's son". Bouwe is a short form of the given name Boudewijn. Variant forms are Bauwens, Boudens, Bouwen, Bouwense and Bouwes. People with the surname include:

Antonius Bouwens (1876–1963), Dutch sports shooter, brother of Herman
 (born 1991), Dutch swimmer
Hans Bouwens (born 1944), Dutch singer and songwriter known as "George Baker"
Herman Bouwens (1868–1955), Dutch sports shooter, brother of Antoine
 (1515–1582), Dutch Mennonite leader
Maarten Bouwens (1511–1583), Dutch theologian and first bishop of Ypres
Richard Bouwens van der Boijen (1863–1939), French architect
Rychard Bouwens (born 1972), American astronomer at Leiden University

See also
Bauwens, variant spelling of the surname, more common in Belgium
Bouwe Bekking (born 1963), Dutch competitive sailor

References

Dutch-language surnames
Patronymic surnames
Surnames of Dutch origin
Lists of people by surname